
Gmina Dębowa Kłoda is a rural gmina (administrative district) in Parczew County, Lublin Voivodeship, in eastern Poland.

Neighbouring gminas
Gmina Dębowa Kłoda is bordered by the gminas of Jabłoń, Parczew, Podedwórze, Sosnowica, Stary Brus, Uścimów and Wyryki.

Villages
The gmina contains the following villages having the status of sołectwo: Bednarzówka, Białka, Chmielów, Dębowa Kłoda, Hanów, Kodeniec, Korona, Leitnie, Lubiczyn, Makoszka, Marianówka, Nietiahy, Pachole, Plebania Wola, Stępków, Uhnin, Wyhalew, Zadębie and Żmiarki.

References

Polish official population figures 2006

Debowa Kloda
Parczew County